Sir John Barton (5 August 1771 – 25 August 1834) was an English engineer.

Information
He created a micrometer, which he called the "Atometer" that was used for measuring small distances using a differential-screw technique, a ruling engine, and patented a method of creating metal ornaments engraved with parallel lines, using diffraction to create colours. An example of the latter are "Barton's Buttons", which were gold buttons stamped with a hard steel die on which Barton cut hexagonal patterns. Sir John Barton also invented a floating compass.

Sir John Barton served as deputy comptroller of the Royal Mint in the early part of the nineteenth century and later as Treasurer to Queen Adelaide. He died at Windsor on 25 August 1834. After his death, his wife Ann gave John Harrison's last pendulum clock to the Royal Astronomical Society.

Personal life
John Barton's wife was the granddaughter of John Harrison, of longitude fame, which is how Ann Barton had possession of Harrison's last pendulum clock and could give it away.  Queen Adelaide was godmother to the Bartons' daughter, who was also named Adelaide and who was to become the great grandmother of the writer of this paragraph.  John Barton had gained his knighthood while private secretary to the Prince of Wales for services rendered in keeping the prince's wife out of the way while the prince was consorting with his mistress.  Sir John Barton became a frequent and well received visitor to Windsor Castle, and his memorial plaque is now to be seen in St. George's chapel there.

References

External links
 Picture of a set of buttons engraved by John Barton with diffraction patterns, c 1825, in the collection at the London Science Museum
Nature.com article on Barton's engravings (subscription only)

1771 births
1834 deaths
English inventors
English mechanical engineers
Engineers from Plymouth, Devon